The Triqui or Trique are an indigenous people of the western part of the Mexican state of Oaxaca, centered in the municipalities of Juxtlahuaca, Tlaxiaco and Putla. They number around 23,000 according to Ethnologue surveys. The Triqui language is a Mixtecan language of Oto-Manguean genetic affiliation. Trique peoples are known for their distinctive woven huipiles, baskets, and morrales (handbags). 

Triqui people live in a mountainous region, called "La Mixteca Baja", in the southwestern part of the state of Oaxaca, Mexico. This high elevation permits low-lying cumulus clouds to envelop entire towns during the afternoons and evenings.

Like many other southern Mexicans, many Triqui men travel to Oaxaca City, Mexico City, or the United States as day labourers or migrant workers. As the average daily salary of a rural Oaxacan is less than $5 (U.S.) and La Mixteca is the poorest region of Oaxaca, migration and remittances sent back to Oaxaca confer economic benefits to both migrant Triquis and their families in Oaxaca. Triqui women are more likely to remain in the Triqui region and do not travel as often as Triqui men do.

Custom

One of the notable customs of Triqui people is the practice of bride price. During pre-colonial and colonial times, this was a common practice amongst Native Americans in Mesoamerica, other groups like the Mixtecs of Oaxaca continue practicing a bride price based marriage. It is typical in Trique culture for a man to offer a bride's family money, food, and other products in exchange for the bride's hand in marriage. Generally, the husband and wife know each other prior to this arrangement and there is no arrangement without consent. Those opposed to this custom argue that it appears to them to be like slavery or prostitution. Those opposed to intervening in this custom argue that consent is required and that this Triqui custom is not conceived of as immoral.

Agriculture
The Triqui economic income comes through the cultivation of various crops such as corn, beans, pumpkin, chili peppers, quelite, and lima beans among others. But the most important crops are both the banana, and the coffee bean. The products are sold in tianguis (open-air markets) found in Chicahuaztla, Copala, San Martín, Itunyoso, Tlaxiaco, Putla, or Juxtlahuaca.

The Triquis practice the slash and burn cultivation system. This work is done by various families (between 20-30 people) in order to plant milpa (corn fields) throughout large terrains. This type of collaborate work is known as «mipa colectiva» or «milpa en compañía»

Livestock 
Another source of income for the Triqui families is the raising of animals. Mainly they raise cattle, bovines, sheep, goats, pigs and horses. On a smaller scale, they also raise chicken, turkey and duck. In the lower lands, they also practice beekeeping.

Sports
The main sport practiced by the Triqui people is basketball, and as such, a basketball court can be found in all their surrounding communities. Tournaments are held during local festivals where all the athletes participate. The various institutes of education also hold basketball tournaments among all the surrounding schools. Gaining in popularity, although not widely practiced among the Trique is football.

The documentary film Gigantes Descalzos chronicles a team of Triqui youth basketball players.

See also
 Trique language
 Santo Domingo del Estado
 San Juan Copala
 San Martín Itunyoso

References

Bibliography

External links 
 Triqui monograph on Everyculture.

Triqui